Euippe or Evippe (Ancient Greek: Εὐίππη; English translation: "good mare"), daughter of Tyrimmas, King of Dodona, She bore Odysseus a son, Euryalus, who was later mistakenly slain by his father.

Note

References 

 Parthenius, Love Romances translated by Sir Stephen Gaselee (1882-1943), S. Loeb Classical Library Volume 69. Cambridge, MA. Harvard University Press. 1916.  Online version at the Topos Text Project.
 Parthenius, Erotici Scriptores Graeci, Vol. 1. Rudolf Hercher. in aedibus B. G. Teubneri. Leipzig. 1858. Greek text available at the Perseus Digital Library.
Princesses in Greek mythology

Epirotic mythology